Álvaro Raul Duarte Sandoval (born 12 January 1991) is a Colombian professional road cyclist. His brother Fabio is also a professional cyclist.

Major results

2011
 1st Stage 2 Vuelta a Cundinamarca
 5th Overall Vuelta a Bolivia
1st Stage 9b
2015
 1st  Mountains classification Vuelta a Colombia
 1st Stage 9 Clásico RCN
 6th Overall Vuelta a Guatemala
1st Stages 5 & 6
2016
 1st Stage 2 Vuelta a Cundinamarca
2017
 1st Stage 3 Clásica de Fusagasugá
2018
 1st  Overall Tour de Lombok
 9th Overall Tour de Langkawi
1st  Mountains classification

References

External links

1991 births
Living people
Colombian male cyclists
People from Cundinamarca Department
20th-century Colombian people
21st-century Colombian people